Too Many Wives is a 1937 comedy film directed by Ben Holmes and starring Anne Shirley. It lost $35,000.

Plot
To gain a job as a newspaper reporter, desperate dog walker Barry Trent lies that he is married with children and needs the employment badly. When he begins dating Betty Jackson, his lies come back to bite him, including when her high-society suitor Clabby pays a woman named Angela a thousand dollars to lie that she is Barry's wife.

A robbery of a valuable stamp is a further complication, but Barry solves the crime (a dog has the stamp) and then races to city hall to stop Betty from marrying Clabby.

Cast

References

External links
Too Many Wives at TCMDB

1937 films
1937 comedy films
American comedy films
American black-and-white films
Films directed by Ben Holmes
1930s American films